Dominic Inglot and Robert Lindstedt were the defending champions, but chose not to participate together. Inglot played alongside Marin Draganja, but lost in the quarterfinals to Lindstedt and Aisam-ul-Haq Qureshi. Lindstedt and Qureshi then lost in the semifinals to Andre Begemann and Leander Paes.

Guillermo García-López and Henri Kontinen won the title, defeating Begemann and Paes in the final, 4–6, 7–6(8–6), [10–8].

Seeds

Draw

Draw

References
Main Draw

Winston-Salem Open - Doubles
2016 Doubles